Kowthalam is a  village in mandal, located in Kurnool district of the Indian state of Andhra Pradesh.Kowthalam mandal consists 33 Villages.

References 

Villages in Kurnool district
Dargah Hazrath Khwaja Syed shah Abdul Qadir Muhammad Muhammad ul Hussaini Chistiy Ul Qadriy Lingband Jagadguru R.A Al Maroof Hazrath Khwaja Syed shah Qader linga Saheb Jagadguru Kowtalam village , Adoni Taluk, Kurnool District, A.P